The 1966–67 Scottish Division Two was won by Morton who, along with second placed Raith Rovers, were promoted to the First Division. Brechin City finished bottom.

Table

References 

 Scottish Football Archive

Scottish Division Two seasons
2
Scot